= Radionucleotide =

Radionucleotide may refer to:

- In experimental biochemistry, a nucleotide that is radiolabeled with a radionuclide such as phosphorus-32
- When used in clinical medical literature, usually an error for the intended term radionuclide
